Lee Jae-woo (Hanja: 李載雨; born February 9, 1980) is a South Korean relief pitcher who plays for the Doosan Bears in the South Korean professional baseball league.

Career
Lee is from Seoul and in 2009, he played on the South Korean national team in the World Baseball Classic.

References

External links
Career statistics and player information from Korea Baseball Organization
Lee Jae-woo at doosanbears.com 

1980 births
Living people
South Korean baseball players
Doosan Bears players
2009 World Baseball Classic players
Baseball players from Seoul